is an above-ground metro station located in Kōnan-ku, Yokohama, Kanagawa, Japan operated by the Yokohama Municipal Subway’s Blue Line (Line 1). It is 11.0 kilometers from the terminus of the Blue Line at Shōnandai Station.

History
Kaminagaya Station was opened on September 4, 1976, initially as a terminal station the Blue Line. The line was extended on to Maioka Station on March 14, 1985. Platform screen doors were installed in September 2007.

Lines
Yokohama Municipal Subway
Blue Line

Station layout
Kaminagaya Station is an elevated station with two above-ground island platforms serving four tracks. The platforms are on the third floor, with the exit gates and station building below.

Platforms

References
 Harris, Ken and Clarke, Jackie. Jane's World Railways 2008-2009. Jane's Information Group (2008).

External links
 Kaminagaya Station (Blue Line) 

Railway stations in Kanagawa Prefecture
Railway stations in Japan opened in 1976
Blue Line (Yokohama)